Francisco Wánderson do Carmo Carneiro (born 18 February 1986), commonly known as Wánderson, is Brazilian former professional footballer who played as an attacking midfielder or second striker.

Career

Club
Wánderson previously played for Swedish club GAIS. He signed a four-and-a-half-year deal in July 2007 with GAIS, coming from Fortaleza. In Allsvenskan 2009 he scored 18 goals, making him top scorer in the league alongside IFK Göteborg player Tobias Hysén.

On 27 July 2010, Wánderson signed a three-year contract with Saudi Arabian team Al-Ahli.

On 31 March 2011, it was announced that Wánderson would spend the next 6 months on loan at his former club GAIS.

Krasnodar
On 6 September 2012, Wanderson moved to FC Krasnodar on a six-month loan deal from GAIS, with an option to make the move permanent. At the end of the 2012–13 Wanderson was joint top goalscorer with Yura Movsisyan on 13 goals. On 13 December 2012, Krasnodar signed Wanderson on a permanent basis, with the striker agreeing a two-year deal, with the option of a third. At the end of the 2013–14 season Wanderson was named in the end of season "Best 33" list by the Russian Football Union.

He left Krasnodar upon the expiration of his contract at the end of the 2016–17 season.

Dynamo Moscow
On 14 June 2017, Wánderson signed with FC Dynamo Moscow.

Alanyaspor
On 31 January 2018, he moved to the Turkish club Alanyaspor.

Helsingborgs IF
On 7 August 2018, Wánderson returned to Sweden signing with Helsingborgs IF in Superettan, the second tier. He signed a contract running until 2021, rejoining Andreas Granqvist, his former teammate at Krasnodar. He retired in January 2020.

Atlético Cearense
He returned to playing in early 2021 with Atlético Cearense, and retired again in June.

International career
Wánderson indicated that he would be likely to accept a call-up for Russia national team if asked.

Career statistics

Honours
 Allsvenskan top scorer: 2009 with 18 goals
 Russian Premier League top scorer: 2012–13 with 13 goals
 List of 33 top players of the Russian league: 2013–14

References

External links
GAIS profile

1986 births
People from Baturité
Sportspeople from Ceará
Living people
Association football midfielders
Association football forwards
Brazilian footballers
Fortaleza Esporte Clube players
River Atlético Clube players
GAIS players
Al-Ahli Saudi FC players
FC Krasnodar players
FC Dynamo Moscow players
Alanyaspor footballers
Helsingborgs IF players
FC Atlético Cearense players
Allsvenskan players
Saudi Professional League players
Russian Premier League players
Süper Lig players
Superettan players
Brazilian expatriate footballers
Brazilian expatriate sportspeople in Sweden
Expatriate footballers in Sweden
Brazilian expatriate sportspeople in Saudi Arabia
Expatriate footballers in Saudi Arabia
Brazilian expatriate sportspeople in Russia
Expatriate footballers in Russia
Brazilian expatriate sportspeople in Turkey
Expatriate footballers in Turkey